Darryl White (born 1971/72) is a Canadian banker, and the chief executive officer (CEO) of Bank of Montreal, since 1 November 2017, when he succeeded Bill Downe.

Darryl holds a Bachelor of Arts in Honors Business Administration from the Ivey School of Business at the University of Western Ontario and has completed the Advanced Management Program at the Harvard Business School. He is a past recipient of Canada's Top 40 under 40® Award.

References

Living people
Directors of Bank of Montreal
Canadian chief executives
Chief operating officers
University of Western Ontario alumni
1970s births
Canadian bankers